Azadoota is an Assyrian Australian worldbeat band formed in 1996 in Sydney, Australia that fuses traditional Assyrian pop and folk with Latin music. Its founder, Robin Zirwanda, the band's percussionist and lead singer, writes and sings the songs in Assyrian Neo-Aramaic. The name of the band Azadoota (pronounced ah-zah-doota) means 'freedom' in the Assyrian language.

Represented by traditional costumes worn in the ancient Assyrian royal court, Azadoota is one of the few professional bands in the world that performs in the Assyrian language, and is the only Assyrian act to target their presentations specifically to mainstream audiences. The band performs original Assyrian music which the members describe as "contemporary Assyrian dance-rock worldbeat". The employment of styles derived from popular music  in combination with the Assyrian lore provides the band's music a quality where listeners can relate to.

History
Azadoota's lead singer and founder, Robin Haider Zirwanda, was born in Dora, Baghdad in 1954. In his childhood, Zirwanda stated “I used to find the key to the music room and play all the instruments. But the drums were for me”. He migrated to Australia unaccompanied in 1971 when he was 17 years old with a guitar and a suitcase, not knowing a word in English. After his family arrived, they settled in Arnhem Land in the town of Nhulunbuy. Zirwanda then joined a band and formed a close bond with the indigenous community there. After relocating to Sydney in the 1980s, he worked as a percussionist in the cabaret scene and also with original bands on the pub circuit. In 1986, Zirwanda played with American folk singer Don McLean as his percussionist in McLean's 3-month Australian tour.

In the early 1990s, the rising prominent of world music inspired Robin to create his own music in his native Aramaic language. Even though Zirwanda wrote lyrics in Assyrian, his music was strongly influenced by the styles he'd been performing as a percussionist earlier in his career, and this became the foundation for Azadoota. In 1996, the band was formed, containing members from the Netherlands to Argentina, combining Latin American music and harmony spanning across musical genres and global cultures, to project and preserve the Assyrian identity in the modern-day world, with its first gig being held in Byron Bay. Regarding the name of the band, Zirwanda states, “Azadoota is Assyrian for 'freedom', and our music celebrates of the freedom we have in this country [Australia] to express ourselves through music.”

They released the album “Planetarian” in 2008 and “Beyond Bridges” in 2011. Their recent songs “Lishana (Jesus Spoke My Language)”, “Mazreta” (Spinning Top) and “Unity” are a plea for Assyrians in the western world to protect their heritage in order to secure their future. “Lishana” ("language"), which came out in 2015, became a moderate success among the Assyrians in the diaspora.

Concerts

The band has regularly performed at a diverse range of venues, from the smallest bush halls and pubs to the most well-known festivals. Azadoota has most notably performed at WOMADelaide in 2014 and Woodford Folk Festival in 2016, which drew in unsuspecting listeners due to the band's ethnic rhythms, theatrical musicality, and the sounds of the ancient language. The band regularly performs at the Assyrian new year festival in Fairfield Showground in Sydney each April, which typically draws 10,000 revellers. In August 2018, the band toured North America for the first time.

Regarding foreigners listening to Azadoota's music, Zirwanda states “It’s unbelievable; the Aussies buy your CDs, come to your gigs, and pay to see you sing in Assyrian.” On performing at concerts and festivals, Zirwanda states:Performing at festivals is a big deal for us, because we represent such a little known-nation. We are the only band in the world performing Assyrian music on the mainstream stage, so we carry a great responsibility to spread awareness of culture and the issues facing our people in the global community. Festivals offer us a valuable opportunity to do this. Compared to 20 years ago, I think the audiences now are much more receptive to global music.

Musical style

The band makes use of a horn section, rhythm guitar, brass instruments, guira and tambourine. The band may also use rhythms of Assyrian folk music (each associated with folk-dance moves), whilst presenting them in contemporary arrangements. A merengue groove may also be used. Robin Zirwanda fronts the band with timbales and doumbek, usually switching casually from Cuban rhythms to those of his ethnicity. Azadoota's music spans genres and generations, with diverse music styles – from percussive-heavy dance tunes inspired by Caribbean music genres, funk, folk rock, jazz fusion and reggae, to sentimental ballads.

According to the band's lead singer, the horn section indicates a revival of Assyrian culture and a resistance of the destruction occurring in their ancestral lands. Azadoota performs in attire inspired by their ancient royal ancestors, such as Ashurbanipal, Ashurnasirpal I and Nebuchadnezzar – which would showcase a flamboyant sight and also inspires discussion on themes of Assyrian heritage, musical history and cultural continuity. About the band's style, Zirwanda states: We use contemporary instrumentation with traditional Assyrian rhythms and song-forms, but because I'm a percussionist by trade I find there's a fair bit of Latin and Afro-Cuban influence in my songwriting...I sing about my homeland Iraq, about belonging to a nation without a land, about family and of course about love. Most [of our] songs are upbeat and danceable, with a positive message.

Regarding his skills, Zirwanda states, “When you’re in percussion, you learn all the rhythms: congo, rumba. I’d be tapping on the kitchen table, then I’d start singing a song, and I’d write it that way.” The band's front man Zirwanda cites Youssou N'Dour, Salif Keita and Santana as his influence, and as well as his father Awimalk Haider, who had made jazz music in the 1960s in Iraq, blending it with Assyrian folk. Triple J likens their musical style to Shakira and The Cat Empire. Zirwanda has oftentimes been assisted by his father Awimalk Haider with the songwriting because of his talent as a lyricist and knowledge in the Assyrian language. Although the band has gotten positive reception from Assyrians, some have found that its method is concealing the true Assyrian identity and suppressing its integrity. In response to this, Zirwanda says, “We’ve got to get our name [as Assyrians] out there in the world, in the bigger picture. Why not expose yourself so the world knows about you?”.

Band members

Robin Zirwanda – front man, timbales and doumbek
Rory – guitar
Stuart Vandegraaff – saxophone
Paris Freed – backup singer
Siomon – bass guitar

Artists listed below have casually filled in the spots of the above members, were past members, or have simply served as additional musicians for the band in the past or present:

Murat Kucukarslan and Ben Wild – bass guitar
Vashti Sivell – piano
Tatyana Dunlop – backing vocals and keyboard
Chris Fields and Steve Marin – drums
Ben Samuels – sax and clarinet 
Nick Ciccarelli and Marty Farrugia – trumpets
Nick Ujhazy – guitar

Discography

Albums
Planetarian (2008)
Beyond Bridges (2011)

Singles
Lishana (Jesus Spoke My Language) (2015)
Mazreta (Spinning Top) (2017)
Unity (2018)
Shinneh (Years) (2018)
Bruni (My Son) (2019)

References

External links
Facebook page
 
 Instagram page

Latin music groups
Musical groups established in 1996
Musical groups from Sydney
Musical quartets
1996 establishments in Australia
Assyrian musicians
Syriac-language singers
Australian folk rock groups
Salsa music groups
Australian dance music groups
Australian world music groups
Australian folk music groups